The National Democratic Party (NDP) is a political party in Suriname. It was founded on 4 July 1987 by Surinamese leader Dési Bouterse, and was one of the first parties in the country to have a stable base of support across different ethnic groups. In the 2015 general election the party scored 45.56% of the vote and 26 of 51 seats in parliament.

NDP chairman Bouterse was elected President of Suriname on 19 July 2010, after he won the 2010 elections with his Mega Combination of which the NDP was the dominant party. The party won the 2015 elections as well, winning 26 seats against an alliance of 7 (later 6) opposition parties.

In the 2020 elections, the NDP won 16 of the 51 seats. Dési Bouterse lost the presidency and he was succeeded by opposition leader Chan Santokhi. The opposition parties formed a new coalition government. The NDP subsequently became the main opposition party.

Foundation 
The NDP was formed from a reorganisation of the Vijfentwintig Februari Beweging (VFB, February Twenty-Five Movement), a political movement established on 24 November 1983 by Dési Bouterse and the ruling military junta.

Electoral results

Trivia 
 The NDP was the first political party in Suriname to have a website.  It was set up for the 1996 election campaign.

References

External links
Official website

Political parties in Suriname
Political parties established in 1987
Socialist parties in South America
1987 establishments in South America
Socialism in Suriname